Monument Valley High School may refer to:
Monument Valley High School (Arizona)
Monument Valley High School (Utah)